Sant'Egidio is a convent church in Trastevere, Rome.  Sant'Egidio (St. Giles) is the patron saint of hermits.

The church was founded in 1630 and was abandoned by the nuns in 1971. In 1973, it was occupied by the Community of Sant'Egidio, which had been founded in 1968, and was still looking for a meeting place of its own. The community, which had not had a name before, then chose to name itself after its church.

Together with the adjacent former Carmelite monastery, the church forms the seat of the Community of Sant'Egidio.

It has been the titular church of Cardinal Matteo Zuppi since 5 October 2019.

Notes and references 
 Pierre Anouilh, "Des pauvres a la paix. Aspects de l'action pacificatrice de Sant'Egidio au Mozambique", _LFM. Sciences sociales et mmissions_, No.17, Dec. 2005, pp. 11–40
 Eric Morier-Genoud, "Sant’ Egidio et la paix. Interviews de Don Matteo Zuppi & Ricardo Cannelli", _LFM. Sciences sociales et mmissions_, Oct 2003, pp. 119–145

External links 

 The Community of Sant'Egidio homepage
 DREAM (Drug Resource Enhancement against AIDS and malnutrition) programm - The Community of Sant'Egidio
 NO to the Death Penalty - The Community of Sant'Egidio

17th-century Roman Catholic church buildings in Italy
Egidio
Churches of Rome (rione Trastevere)